James McBride (30 December 1873 – 25 May 1899) was a Scottish footballer, who played for Liverpool during the latter half of the 19th century.

Life and playing career
Born in Renton, Dunbartonshire, Scotland, McBride played for Renton Wanderers and Renton before being signed by Liverpool managers John McKenna and William Edward Barclay in 1892, a short time after he took part in a trial for the Scotland national team and made his sole appearance for the Scottish Football League XI (in the first fixture they played). McBride made his debut in Liverpool's first ever fixture, a friendly against Rotherham Town on 1 September 1892, which Liverpool won 7–1. He also played in their first ever competitive match, a Lancashire League fixture against Higher Walton two days later. He scored his first goal for Liverpool in this game, which the team won 8–0.

McBride was a regular during Liverpool's unbeaten debut season in the Football League Second Division, missing just 4 of the 28 games. Liverpool gained promotion to the top flight of English football, replacing Newton Heath by winning 2–0 in a test (play-off) match. He only played five more times for the Anfield club during their relegation back down to the lower level.

Honors
Liverpool
 Football League Second Division (1894)

References

Sources
 Profile at LFCHistory.net

1873 births
1899 deaths
Liverpool F.C. players
Manchester City F.C. players
Scottish footballers
Renton F.C. players
Scottish Football League players
Scottish Football League representative players
English Football League players
Association football wing halves
Footballers from West Dunbartonshire
People from Renton, West Dunbartonshire